Prunus fasciculata, also known as wild almond, desert almond, or desert peach is a spiny and woody shrub producing wild almonds, which is native to western deserts of North America.

Description
The bark is gray and without hairs (glabrous).

Sepals are hairless and without lobes or teeth. The flowers are small and white with 3-mm petals, occurring either solitary or in fascicles and are without a petal stem (subsessile) growing from the leaf axils. They are dioecious. Male flowers have 10–15 stamens; female, one or more pistils. The plant displays numerous fragrant flowers from March to May, which attract the bees that pollinate it.

The species lives many years (is perennial), and drops its leaves (deciduous).

Taxonomy
The plant was first classified as Emplectocladus fasciculata in an 1853 paper by John Torrey based on a collection of the plants of California acquired during the third expedition of John C. Fremont in 1845; whence the synonym Emplectocladus fasciculata (Torr.) The work was illustrated by Isaac Sprague. Torrey devised the genus Empectocladus to comprise a few desert shrubs. According to Silas C. Mason the genus has 
... a top so densely branched, angled and interlocked as to well merit the name Emplectocladus (Greek, "woven branch"), signifying interlocked branches ...
According to George Bentham and Joseph Dalton Hooker the name fasciculata means that the leaves are in fascicles, or little bundles: 
Leaves small, spatulate, as it were of precious stones, subglobose fasciculate
However, Asa Gray publishing in 1874 reclassified Empectocladus to Prunus resulting in the designation Prunus fasciculata (Torr.) A. Gray (subg. Emplectocladus), in which the desert shrubs become a subgenus. In 1996 Jepson defined a California variety with smooth leaves, punctata, in comparison to which Gray's species, with pubescent leaves, becomes the variety, fasciculata. Unfortunately, the binomial Prunus punctata was already used in 1878 to describe what is now known to be Prunus phaeosticta. Prunus fasciculata punctata grows in the coastal ranges as well as in the desert.

Palaeobotanical evidence 
Middens from rodent activities such as those of the pack rat are a rich source of plant macrofossils from late Pleistocene habitats. At Point of Rocks in Nevada by 11,700 BP, desert shrubs such as desert almond had replaced Juniper and Joshua trees, indicating the onset of the modern desert. Somewhat earlier, 17,000–14,000 BP, desert almond flourished in a mixed desert and woodland ecology on the Colorado Plateau.

Distribution and habitat 
The species is native to the deserts of Arizona, California, Baja California, Nevada, and Utah. It prefers sandy or rocky soil on dry slopes and washes, usually below  elevation.

Uses 
The plant is not cultivated. Some Native Americans in its limited range learned traditional ways of using it: the Cahuilla prepared the drupe as a delicacy. The wild almonds were considered a delicacy by Native Americans. The Kawaiisu found the tough twigs useful as drills in starting fires and as the front portion of arrow shafts. The seed contains too much cyanide to be edible, although there is some archaeological evidence that the seeds were pounded into flour and leached to make it edible by the ancient population of the Mojave desert.

References

External links
 
 Prunus fasciculata - U.C. CalPhoto Gallery
 

fasciculata
Desert fruits
Flora of Baja California
Flora of California
Flora of the Southwestern United States
Natural history of the Colorado Desert
Natural history of the Mojave Desert
Natural history of the California chaparral and woodlands
Natural history of the Peninsular Ranges
Natural history of the Santa Monica Mountains
Natural history of the Transverse Ranges
Plants described in 1851
Taxa named by Asa Gray
Taxa named by John Torrey
Drought-tolerant plants
Plants used in Native American cuisine
Dioecious plants
Flora without expected TNC conservation status